is a former Japanese football player.

Playing career
Hattori was born in Narashino on November 22, 1977. After graduating from high school, he joined the J1 League club Sanfrecce Hiroshima in 1996. On November 19, he debuted against Yokohama Marinos in the last match of the 1996 season. In 1998, he became a regular player as left side midfielder and played many matches for a long time. He also played full time for 171 matches in a row from November 2002 to August 2007. The club won second place in the 1999 and 2007 Emperor's Cups and the 2010 J.League Cup. However his opportunity to play decreased in 2020 in favor of a new member named Satoru Yamagishi. In 2012, he moved to the J2 League club Fagiano Okayama. He retired at the end of the 2012 season.

Club statistics

Honors
Individual
J1 League Fair Play Award - 2009

References

External links

1977 births
Living people
People from Narashino
Association football people from Chiba Prefecture
Japanese footballers
J1 League players
J2 League players
Sanfrecce Hiroshima players
Fagiano Okayama players
Association football midfielders